The Blue Diamond is a tourist route in Iceland covering about 50 km looping from Reykjavik into the Reykjanes Peninsula and back.

The primary stops on the Blue Diamond route in the Reykjanes Geopark are Gunnuhver (largest mud geyser in Iceland), Valahnúkur, Walk inside a crater – Stamparnir, The Raven Rift (just like in Þingvellir – Almannagjá), The Bridge Between Continents, Reykjanes lighthouse, Friðrik VIII, Presidents hill, Power Plant Earth, Fire Island, Krísuvík, Seltún, Vikingworld, Kvikan – House of Culture and Natural Resources and the Blue Lagoon. Other stops include The Icelandic Museum of Rock 'n' Roll, Duushús : culture and art center, Sudurnes Science and Learning Center Sandgerði, Flösin Garðskaga, Stafnes church and the Svartsengi and Reykjanesvirkjun geothermal power plants.

Global Geoparks Network members
Roads in Iceland
Scenic routes